HMS Whippingham was a  of the Royal Navy.

Their names were all chosen from villages ending in -ham. The minesweeper was named after Whippingham on the Isle of Wight.

References
Blackman, R.V.B. ed. Jane's Fighting Ships (1953)

Ham-class minesweepers
Ships built in the United Kingdom
1954 ships
Cold War minesweepers of the United Kingdom
Ham-class minesweepers of the French Navy